"The Simpsons Theme", also referred to as "The Simpsons Main Title Theme" in album releases, is the theme music of the animated television series The Simpsons. It plays during the opening sequence and was composed by Danny Elfman in 1989, after series creator Matt Groening approached him requesting a theme. The piece has been noted by Elfman as the most popular of his career.

Recording
Groening showed Elfman a rough edit of the opening sequence in their initial meeting, where Elfman suggested "something retro" since it had "such a classic feel." He wrote the tune "in the car on the way home from the meeting." He recorded the demo in his home studio later that day. Elfman sang the three opening notes of "The Simpsons" himself with two friends.

The theme was re-arranged during season 2, and the current arrangement by Alf Clausen was introduced at the beginning of season 3. It has also been edited many times to coincide with edits of various lengths for the opening sequence, and there have been extended edits and re-recordings for lengthened opening sequences. Several versions of the saxophone solo riff, ostensibly played by character Lisa Simpson in the animated sequence, have been created over the course of the series. The theme is in the acoustic scale.

A slightly different arrangement of the theme usually plays over the end credits of the show.  Originally, there were two main versions of the closing theme, with the longer version ending in a lower key.  Both versions were re-arranged for season 3, but only the short version was in use by the time the show switched domestic production from Klasky Csupo to Film Roman in season 4, and that version was edited to be even shorter by the end of season 6. The alternate longer closing theme however resurfaced in a handful of post-season 4 episodes, but mostly in credit sequences that do not play music during the first half of the sequence (either with dialogue heard underneath or video footage playing under the first half of the credits).

Awards
The Simpsons theme has won the National Music Award for "Favorite TV Theme" in 2002 and the BMI TV Music Award three times in 1996, 1998, and 2003. It was also nominated for the Primetime Emmy Award for Outstanding Main Title Theme Music in 1990.

Alternative versions
In addition to the standard closing theme arrangement, certain episodes have had alternate versions of the closing theme used; some are composed in-house by Alf Clausen in alternate styles or as homages to other musical works, and some are covers by musical artists. Most of the time, these are used to tie into the plot of the episode itself. For example, several police or law-related episodes have ended with homages to the themes from Dragnet, and Hill Street Blues. Most of the Treehouse of Horror halloween episodes have opened with a horror or monster movie-styled arrangement, or with homages to themes such as The Addams Family. Other versions are performed by guest stars heard in an episode, such as a psychedelic rock version performed by Yo La Tengo, a chicano rock version by Los Lobos, and a post-rock version by Sigur Rós. The noise rock version by Sonic Youth, which aired at the end of the episode "Homerpalooza", has been ranked among the best versions of the theme by Matt Groening  and also by Chris Turner in his book Planet Simpson. Other performers include Tito Puente, NRBQ, Fall Out Boy, The Supersonicos, and an a cappella version by Canvas. Guitarist Danny Gatton did a blues rock rendition of the theme on his 1991 album 88 Elmira St. In the Disney+ short When Billie Met Lisa, a version performed by Billie Eilish appears.

Green Day version

In 2007, Green Day recorded a cover version of the theme song for The Simpsons Movie and also released it as a single. It placed as high as number six on the Billboard Bubbling Under Hot 100 Singles, number 19 on the UK Singles Chart, and number sixteen on the UK download chart. Also for The Simpsons Movie, Hans Zimmer, who composed the score for the film, arranged his own version of the theme in an orchestral genre consistent with the original and also inserted "tiny fragments" of it into the rest of his score.

It marks the third time that Green Day has taped an instrumental track, following "Last Ride In" from Nimrod and "Espionage" from Shenanigans. The song plays in the beginning, when they perform on the river. It also plays in the end credits.

Weezer version
In 2020, in the 21st episode of season 31 entitled "The Hateful Eight-Year-Olds", Weezer performed their own cover version of the instrumental theme, along with three other songs.

See also
The Simpsons opening sequence

References

Simpsons Theme
Works by Danny Elfman
Green Day songs
2007 singles
1989 songs
Reprise Records singles
Animated series theme songs
Comedy television theme songs